Carex ramosa is a tussock-forming species of perennial sedge in the family Cyperaceae. It is native to Réunion.

See also
List of Carex species

References

ramosa
Taxa named by Carl Ludwig Willdenow
Plants described in 1805
Flora of Réunion